Le Ménil is a commune in the Vosges department in Grand Est in northeastern France.
It is sometimes called Le Ménil-Thillot to distinguish it from nearby Ménil-de-Senones.

Inhabitants are called Guédons.

Geography
The intervening presence of a 952-meter mountain peak means that for motorists the drive to Bussang covers approximately  however. Across the Ménil Pass to the northeast, and approached by smaller roads, is the less well known Moselotte River. The pass connects the seat of the canton, Le Thillot, with Cornimont and a number of smaller mountain villages.

The surrounding mountain summits offer superb views, and tourism has become a defining pillar of the local economy. Registered tourist accommodation exceeds 1,000 beds. The presence of a covered go-kart track in a village with a registered population of barely above 1,000 provides further evidence of the importance of tourism.

History
For a long time Le Ménil was a hamlet controlled by Ramonchamp, but it became a parish in its own right in 1735, and acquired the statute on a commune under the Revolution.

See also
Communes of the Vosges department

References

Communes of Vosges (department)